Duncan Innes is a retired lightweight rower who competed for Great Britain.

Rowing career
He won a gold medal at the 1977 World Rowing Championships in Amsterdam with the lightweight men's eight.

Personal life
His son Stewart Innes rowed at the 2016 Summer Olympics.

References

Year of birth missing (living people)
British male rowers
World Rowing Championships medalists for Great Britain
Living people